Joseph Johann Baptist Andreas von Zerboni di Sposetti  (23 May 1766 – 23 May 1831) was a German philosopher.

Biography
In 1796, he wrote to the governor of Silesia a letter in which he set forth the absurdity of granting to the nobility exalted privileges through right of birth. Knowledge of the letter reaching Frederick William III, he was imprisoned for three years on a charge of high treason. When his case was brought to trial he was freed, with no political disability, and later received various official appointments.

References

General references

External links

 This source gives an excerpt of the offending letter, and says F. W. II ordered him to prison.
 This gives the year of his birth as 1866.

1766 births
1831 deaths
German philosophers
German male writers
Provincial Presidents of Posen